Groove metal is a subgenre of heavy metal music that began in the early 1990s. The genre achieved success in the 1990s and continued having success in the 2000s. Inspired by thrash metal and traditional heavy metal, groove metal features raspy singing and screaming, down-tuned guitars, heavy guitar riffs, and syncopated rhythms. Unlike thrash metal, groove metal is usually slower and also uses elements of traditional heavy metal. Pantera are often considered the pioneers of groove metal, and groove metal expanded in the 1990s with bands like White Zombie, Machine Head, and Sepultura. The genre continued in the 2000s with bands like Lamb of God, DevilDriver, and Five Finger Death Punch.

Characteristics

Groove metal is heavily influenced by thrash metal, but is focused more on heaviness as opposed to speed, even though fast songs are still common within the genre. Emphasis lies in heavy guitar riffs, often accompanied by syncopated rhythms, and guitar solos are commonplace. Guitars are generally more down-tuned than in thrash, and vocals typically are yelling, growling, screaming, or very raspy singing.

History

Texas heavy metal band Pantera's 1990 album Cowboys from Hell is often considered the first groove metal album. With this album, Pantera moved away from their glam metal years, starting the groove metal genre. Pantera continued releasing other influential albums through the 1990s. Their 1992 album Vulgar Display of Power featured an even heavier sound than its predecessor, while its follow-up album Far Beyond Driven (1994) peaked at number 1 on the Billboard 200, selling in 186,000 copies its first week of release. Pantera's albums often would quickly get certified gold by the Recording Industry Association of America (RIAA) and eventually would get certified platinum. Vulgar Display of Power is the band's best-selling album, being eventually certified double-platinum.

New York band Prong's second album Beg to Differ, released four months before Cowboys from Hell, is also considered one of the first albums of the genre, with frontman Tommy Victor claiming it was the first groove metal album ever released.

In 1993, Brazilian band Sepultura released Chaos A.D., which saw the band use fewer elements of thrash metal. With Chaos A.D., Sepultura became a groove metal band. Sepultura released their most popular album Roots in 1996. Roots was a groove metal and nu metal album. The album received criticism from fans because the album was very different from older Sepultura albums like Beneath the Remains.

In 1992, thrash metal band Exhorder moved to the groove metal genre with their album The Law. In the 1990s, several other groove metal bands appeared, including Skinlab, Pissing Razors, Machine Head, Grip Inc., and White Zombie. Several other veteran thrash metal bands had also been using elements of groove metal over the ensuing the decade, including Anthrax, Testament, Annihilator, and Overkill (whose earlier works had pioneered the genre, including their 1989 album The Years of Decay).

Machine Head released their debut album Burn My Eyes in 1994. The album helped the band achieve underground success, with the album selling 145,240 copies, according to Nielsen SoundScan.

White Zombie achieved mainstream success in the mid-1990s. The band's album La Sexorcisto: Devil Music Volume One peaked at number 2 on the Heatseekers Albums chart in 1993 and was certified double-platinum by the RIAA in July 1998. White Zombie's music videos were featured on Beavis and Butt-Head which helped the band sell more albums. The band's 1995 follow-up Astro Creep: 2000 peaked at number 6 on the Billboard 200 and sold 104,000 copies in its first week of release. Astro Creep: 2000 was certified double-platinum by the RIAA. White Zombie's song "More Human Than Human" achieved mainstream success in the mid-1990s. It peaked at number 53 on the Radio Songs chart on June 17, 1995. On that day, "More Human Than Human" peaked at number 7 on the Alternative Songs chart. On June 10, 1995, the song peaked at number 10 on the Mainstream Rock Songs chart. "More Human Than Human" was played frequently on MTV and won the Best Metal/Hard Rock Video award at the 1995 MTV Video Music Awards.

In the 2000s, many more groove metal bands emerged, including Five Finger Death Punch, Damageplan, Lamb of God, Chimaira, Hellyeah, and DevilDriver. Damageplan formed after the breakup of Pantera, with Pantera members Dimebag Darrell and Vinnie Paul Abbott being members of Damageplan. Damageplan released one album in 2004 called New Found Power. In December 2004, when the band performed live, guitarist Dimebag Darrell was shot dead by a man named Nathan Gale. After this incident, Damageplan broke up. Dimebag Darrell's brother Vinnie Paul Abbott then became the drummer for Hellyeah in 2006 and remained until his passing in 2018. Lamb of God became popular among heavy metal fans in the mid-2000s along with the metalcore bands that were achieving success at the time. Five Finger Death Punch emerged in the 2000s and achieved moderate success in the 2010s.

Influence on other genres

Groove metal bands like Pantera, White Zombie, Prong, and Sepultura were all big influences on nu metal. Nu metal (e.g., Korn and Slipknot) was a genre that began in the mid-1990s and became mainstream in the late 1990s and early 2000s.

Groove metal bands like Pantera and Sepultura along with crossover thrash bands such as Cro-Mags and Agnostic Front helped to lay the groundwork for metalcore (e.g., Hatebreed and Earth Crisis).

See also
 List of groove metal bands
 New wave of American heavy metal

References

 
Heavy metal genres
1990s in music
2000s in music
American rock music genres
American styles of music